Brachysteles parvicornis is a species of bugs in the family Lyctocoridae. It is found in Africa, Europe and Northern Asia (excluding China), and North America.

References

Further reading

 
 
 

Hemiptera of Africa
Articles created by Qbugbot
Insects described in 1847
Lyctocoridae